Canal Street may refer to:

Places
 Canal Street (Buffalo),  a historically notorious street and district at the western terminus of the Erie Canal in Buffalo, New York, USA
 Canal Street (Manhattan), New York City, New York, USA
 Canal Street station (New York City Subway), a station complex in the Chinatown neighborhood of Manhattan, consisting of:
Canal Street station (IRT Lexington Avenue Line); serving the  trains
Canal Street station (BMT Nassau Street Line); serving the  trains
Canal Street station (BMT Broadway Line); serving the  trains
Canal Street station (BMT Manhattan Bridge Line); serving the  trains
Canal Street station (IND Eighth Avenue Line), a station at Sixth Avenue in Manhattan; serving the  trains
Canal Street station (IRT Broadway–Seventh Avenue Line), a station at Varick Street in Manhattan; serving the  trains
Canal Street station (IRT Second Avenue Line), a former elevated station in Manhattan serving the IRT Second Avenue Line
Canal Street station (IRT Third Avenue Line), a former elevated station in Manhattan serving the IRT Third Avenue Line
 Canal Street station (LIRR), a former Long Island Rail Road station in Queens serving the Main Line and Montauk Branch
 Canal Street (Manchester), Manchester, England, locally known as "The Gay Village"
 Canal Street, New Orleans, New Orleans, Louisiana, USA
 Canal Street, Oxford, Jericho, Oxford, England

Film
Canal Street (film)

Music 
 Canal Street (Arendal, Norway), jazz and blues festival in southern Norway
 "Canal St.", 2015 song by A$AP Rocky from the album AT.LONG.LAST.A$AP.

Sports 
 Canal Street (Runcorn), defunct football and rugby ground in Runcorn, England

See also

Canal Road (disambiguation)
Canal (disambiguation)
Street (disambiguation)